Ouainville is a commune in the Seine-Maritime department in the Normandy region in northern France.

Geography

Population

Places of interest
 The church of St.Maclou, dating from the eighteenth century.
 A sixteenth-century stone cross.

See also
Communes of the Seine-Maritime department

References

External links

Official website of Ouainville 

Communes of Seine-Maritime